Rej Volpato (born 27 August 1986) is an Italian footballer who plays as a striker.

Club career
He started his professional career at Calcio Padova.

Juventus
In mid-2004 Volpato was signed by Juventus F.C. for €400,000 but went on loan to A.C. Siena and A.C. Arezzo in the next two years.

Empoli
On 4 July 2007, he was signed by Empoli in a co-ownership deal (€500,000) that kept him with the Tuscan team for the 2007–2008 Serie A season, along with fellow Juventus youth players Sebastian Giovinco and Claudio Marchisio, who were on loan. After the three players' successful season in Serie A with Empoli, who eventually were relegated to Serie B anyway, Juventus brought back Volpato, Marchisio, and Giovinco. Volpato's 50% rights was priced €400,000 at that time.

Bari
Marchisio and Giovinco continued with Juventus, but it was Volpato who was again farmed out, but this time to Serie B side, A.S. Bari in joint-ownership bid, for €500,000, where he will work with head coach, and former Juventus hero Antonio Conte. He along with several other Juventus youth products flood the Serie B, to gain first team experience. In February 2009 he moved from Bari to Piacenza Calcio, in search if more first team action. Juve gave up the remain registration rights to Bari for free in June 2009.

After spending half a season with Serie B side Gallipoli which relegated at the end of season, it saw Volpato make a move to A.S. Livorno Calcio.

Livorno

References

External links

gazzetta.it

Living people
1986 births
People from Dolo
Association football forwards
Italian footballers
Italy youth international footballers
Calcio Padova players
Juventus F.C. players
A.C.N. Siena 1904 players
S.S. Arezzo players
Empoli F.C. players
S.S.C. Bari players
Piacenza Calcio 1919 players
A.S.D. Gallipoli Football 1909 players
U.S. Livorno 1915 players
F.C. Lumezzane V.G.Z. A.S.D. players
U.S. Pergolettese 1932 players
Serie A players
Serie B players
Serie C players
Sportspeople from the Metropolitan City of Venice
Footballers from Veneto